Char is the solid material that remains after light gases (e.g. coal gas) and tar have been driven out or released from a carbonaceous material during the initial stage of combustion, which is known as carbonization, charring, devolatilization or pyrolysis.

Further stages of efficient combustion (with or without char deposits) are known as gasification reactions, ending quickly when the reversible gas phase of the water gas shift reaction is reached.

See also
 Biochar
 Charcoal
 Coke (fuel)
 Petroleum coke
 Shale oil extraction
 Spent shale

Oil shale
Coal